Abdul Aziz Keita (born 17 June 1990 in Guinea) is a professional footballer from Guinea.

Career 
He started his career for Baraka Djoma SSG. Keita left in January 2012 his club Baraka FC and signed for AS Kaloum. He is currently in the books of Buildcon F.C.in Zambia Super League.

International 
He is a member of the Guinea national football team and played for the team the 2012 Africa Cup of Nations.

Honors 
 Best Goalkeeper of African Cup 2012
 Best Goalkeeper of Africa 2012
 Best Goalkeeper of Africa 2017
 Best Goalkeeper of the Championship 2014–2015
 Best Goalkeeper of the Championship 2015–2016
 Best Goalkeeper of the Championship 2016–2017
 Best Goalkeeper of the Championship 2017–2018
 Zambian Golden Gloves 2017–2018

References

Article in French talking of the transfer of the player to Buildcon FC

Article in French talking about this player and his new club Buildcon FC

1990 births
Living people
Guinean footballers
Guinea international footballers
2012 Africa Cup of Nations players
2015 Africa Cup of Nations players
Association football goalkeepers
Guinea A' international footballers
2016 African Nations Championship players
Guinean expatriate footballers
Expatriate footballers in Zambia
Guinean expatriate sportspeople in Zambia